Theophilus Alfred James Daniel (1817 – 22 March 1893) was a 19th-century Member of Parliament from Southland, New Zealand.

He was from Hastings, Sussex, England, and came to Foveaux Strait via New South Wales. He had been on the Southland and Otago Provincial Councils. He died at Otaitai Bush and his funeral was held in Riverton on 26 March 1893.

Daniel married Elizabeth Stevens, the half-sister of John Howell, the founder of Riverton. His building in Riverton's main street, known as Daniel House, is registered with Heritage New Zealand as a Category II structure.

References

|-

1817 births
1893 deaths
Mayors of places in Southland, New Zealand
Members of the New Zealand House of Representatives
New Zealand MPs for South Island electorates
Unsuccessful candidates in the 1884 New Zealand general election
Unsuccessful candidates in the 1887 New Zealand general election
19th-century New Zealand politicians
English emigrants to New Zealand
People from Hastings
Members of the Otago Provincial Council
Members of the Southland Provincial Council